Jamie Muscato (born 12 April, 1990) is an English actor and singer.

Most known for his portrayal of Jason Dean in the original London run of Heathers: The Musical in 2018, he has starred in several other West End shows since his professional debut in 2009. As a teenager, he was in a production of Unforgotten as a member of the British Youth Music Theatre, continuing his musical theatre training and appearing in other musical theatre competitions. His first professional role was as an ensemble swing for the original London cast of Spring Awakening, also marking his West End debut.

Since October 2022, Muscato has been playing the role of Christian in Moulin Rouge! The Musical.

Life and career

Early life and theatre beginnings 
Muscato grew up in Brighton. When he was eight, he took part in an open audition for a pantomime in his hometown. He then fell in love with acting and joined several amateur theatre companies, saying later on that "[acting has] been the only thing I've wanted to do since then and I've been lucky to make a career out of it". He starred in productions of Unforgotten in the British Youth Music Theatre in 2004 and 2005. In 2006, at the London Wicked day celebration on October 29, he was one of the ten contestants of the singing contest held during the event, where he sang Dancing Through Life. He then went on to win the competition.

Theatre 
Muscato made his professional and West End debut as an ensemble cast member in the original London production of Spring Awakening in 2009. He was cast in the show after its casting director, Pippa Ailion, saw him at a singing competition. He continued starring in shows as ensemble cast members and understudies, playing as Jean Prouvaire in the Les Misérables 25th Anniversary Tour, Joly in Les Misérables in Concert: The 25th Anniversary, understudy for Oliver Barrett in Love Story, understudy for Drew and Franz in Rock of Ages, and understudy for Digby in The Light Princess. His first professional lead role was in 2014 as Eddie Birdlace in the U.K. premiere of Dogfight alongside Laura Jane Matthewson, who played Rose; the cast reunited the next year to perform the musical in concert. In 2015 he played Nathan in The House of Mirrors and Hearts, then Anthony Hope in the Welsh National Opera production of Sweeney Todd, and later took over the role of Joe in Bend It Like Beckham. In 2016, as part of the VAULT Festival, he starred as the titular character in the one-man musical Stay Awake, Jake for four days from February 3rd to 7th, 2016. He later starred as Ben in the London production of Lazarus (musical) from October 25th, 2016, to January 22nd, 2017.

In 2017, Muscato was part of several musical workshops, including Bonnie & Clyde where he played Clyde, and Heathers: The Musical, where he played Jason Dean. Later that year he played a young version of Edward Bloom in The Other Palace run of Big Fish, which ran from November 1st to December 31st, 2017. 

In early 2018, he was recast as Jason Dean in the fully-staged production of Heathers: The Musical in The Other Palace alongside Carrie Hope Fletcher as Veronica, running from June 9th, 2018, to August 4th, 2018; the show made a transfer to the West End where it ran in the Theatre Royal Haymarket from September 3rd, 2018, to November 24th, 2018.

Alongside former castmate Carrie Hope Fletcher, Muscato performed in a production of But I'm a Cheerleader for MT Fest UK as Jared for three days from February 18, 2019 to February 20, 2019. He performed a solo concert as part of the Sunday Favourites series at the Other Palace on June 9th, 2019. He performed alongside friends and former castmembers, covering songs of other artists and performing songs from musicals he had previously starred in. He also celebrated his mother's birthday during the concert. He starred as Henry Glynn in a one-off concert production of The Clockmaker's Daughter on June 16th, 2019. 

Muscato then starred as the lead role in the 2019 Curve Leicester production of West Side Story later that year as Tony, alongside Adriana Ivelisse as Maria. The show ran from November 23, 2019, to January 11, 2020. 

With his former castmate Laura Jane Matthewson, Muscato performed as a part of Back Garden Busk in Chorleywood in August and September 2020, socially distanced from the audience because of the COVID-19 pandemic. In December 2020, Muscato worked with The Umbrella Rooms, performing several songs as a part of a live prerecorded concert on the website.

Muscato starred in a digital revival of BKLYN - The Musical as Taylor, which premiered through the stream.theatre website, which was available from March 22 to April 4, 2021. He was announced to be playing Enjolras in the Les Misérables West End concert on May 4th, 2021. The show ran from May 20th, 2021 to September 5th, 2021.

Muscato has workshopped several musicals recently. On December 3, 2021, he was announced to be part of the cast of "Lady M", a developing musical based on Shakespeare's play Macbeth, where he plays Banquo. A single starring Muscato from the musical was announced on December 22, 2022, titled "However Hard I Try, which was released on January 13, 2023.  On March 24, 2022, he was announced to be part of the cast of the UK workshop of Starry the Musical, a musical based on the letters between Vincent van Gogh and his brother Theo van Gogh. He played Vincent. The workshop ran from March 28, 2022, to April 7, 2022, with a closed industry showing on April 8, 2022. A TikTok video by Steven Sater revealed that Muscato was a part of the workshop cast of "Nero", a musical Sater and Duncan Sheik had been working on since 2006. The video was uploaded on December 17, 2022.

In February 2022, Muscato's rendition of Meant to Be Yours from Heathers: The Musical entered the Spotify Viral Top 50 in 31 countries, Top 5 in 9 countries, and Top 1 in Canada and Australia thanks to a portion of the song becoming viral on the TikTok app. Muscato himself also jumped on the trend, posting his own video with the sound. The sound currently has over 130 thousand videos using it as of January 2023.

On September 5th, 2022, Muscato was announced to be taking over the role of Christian in Moulin Rouge! The Musical, alongside Melissa James who would be taking over the role of Satine. As announced, the cast change happened on October 17, 2022. He was announced to be starring in a one-night-only concert production of Once alongside Carrie Hope Fletcher, which took place on March 12, 2023.

Film and television 
Muscato has appeared as little roles in television and film. He has appeared on Les Misérables (2012 film) as an ensemble student, Cilla (2014 TV series) as Rory Storm, Pistol (miniseries) as Neil Spencer, and The Undeclared War as Finn.

His biggest role in film is in The Colour of Spring where he plays the leading man, Sam Cameron. The film has received critical acclaim, being heavily awarded in film festivals internationally. He has won at least 16 awards for Best Actor across several film festivals.

Acting credits

Film

Television

Theatre

References

External links 

 

1990 births
Living people

English musical theatre actors